
Gmina Bojanowo is an urban-rural gmina (administrative district) in Rawicz County, Greater Poland Voivodeship, in west-central Poland.

Villages
Apart from the town of Bojanowo, Gmina Bojanowo contains the villages and settlements of Czechnów, Gierłachowo, Giżyn, Gołaszyn, Golina Wielka, Golinka, Gościejewice, Kawcze, Pakówka, Parłowice, Potrzebowo, Sowiny, Sułów Mały, Szemzdrowo, Tarchalin, Trzebosz, Wydartowo Drugie, Wydartowo Pierwsze and Zaborowice.

Neighbouring gminas
Gmina Bojanowo is bordered by the gminas of Góra, Miejska Górka, Poniec, Rawicz, Rydzyna and Wąsosz.

References
Polish official population figures 2006

Bojanowo
Rawicz County